The 1969 Eastern Michigan Hurons football team represented Eastern Michigan University as an independent during the 1969 NCAA College Division football season. In their third season under head coach Dan Boisture, the Hurons compiled a 5–4 record and outscored their opponents, 255 to 106.

On September 27, 1969, the Hurons played their first game in Rynearson Stadium, built at a cost of $1.4 million.  The Hurons won the opening game, 10-3, over Akron in front of a crowd of 12,100 spectators. The formal dedication of the new stadium was held on October 25, 1969, before a homecoming day crowd of 17,600; the Hurons lost to Tampa, 17-7, in the dedication day game.

Schedule

References

Eastern Michigan
Eastern Michigan Eagles football seasons
Eastern Michigan Hurons football